The second season of the French version of Dancing with the Stars debuted on TF1 on 8 October 2011. Nine celebrities were paired with nine professional ballroom dancers. Sandrine Quétier and Vincent Cerutti return as the hosts for this season.

Participants

Scoring

Red numbers indicate the couples with the lowest score for each week.
Blue numbers indicate the couples with the highest score for each week.
 indicates the couples eliminated that week.
 indicates the returning couple that finished in the bottom two.
 indicates the winning couple.
 indicates the runner-up couple.
 indicates the third place couple.

Averages 
This table only counts dances scored on the traditional 30-point scale.

Highest and lowest scoring performances
The best and worst performances in each dance according to the judges' marks are as follows (out of 30 except for Jive Marathon & Salsa Marathon):

Couples' Highest and lowest scoring performances
According to the traditional 30-point scale.

Styles, scores and songs

Week 1 

Individual judges scores in the chart below (given in parentheses) are listed in this order from left to right: Alessandra Martines, Jean-Marc Généreux, Chris Marques.

Week 2 

Individual judges scores in the chart below (given in parentheses) are listed in this order from left to right: Alessandra Martines, Jean-Marc Généreux, Chris Marques.

Week 3 

Individual judges scores in the chart below (given in parentheses) are listed in this order from left to right: Alessandra Martines, Jean-Marc Généreux, Chris Marques.

Theme: 1980s week

Week 4 

Individual judges scores in the chart below (given in parentheses) are listed in this order from left to right: Alessandra Martines, Jean-Marc Généreux, Chris Marques.

Theme: Cinema & TV series week

Week 5 

Individual judges scores in the chart below (given in parentheses) are listed in this order from left to right: Alessandra Martines, Jean-Marc Généreux, Chris Marques.

Theme: Dance Blind

Week 6 

Individual judges scores in the chart below (given in parentheses) are listed in this order from left to right: Alessandra Martines, Jean-Marc Généreux, Chris Marques.

Week 7 

Individual judges scores in the chart below (given in parentheses) are listed in this order from left to right: Alessandra Martines, Jean-Marc Généreux, Chris Marques.

Call-Out Order 
The Table Lists in which order the contestants' fates were revealed by Quétier and Cerutti.

 This couple came in first place with the judges.
 This couple came in last place with the judges.
 This couple came in last place with the judges and was eliminated.
 This couple was eliminated.
 This couple won the competition.
 This couple came in second in the competition.
 This couple came in third in the competition.

Dance schedule
The celebrities and professional partners danced one of these routines for each corresponding week.
Week 1 : Cha Cha Cha, Quickstep or Rumba
Week 2 : Jive, Tango or Viennese Waltz
Week 3 : Samba, Jive, Foxtrot, Paso Doble or Tango (1980s Theme)
Week 4 : Jive, Foxtrot, Viennese Waltz, Charleston, Rumba, Samba, Cha-Cha-Cha or Quickstep (Cinema & TV series Theme)
Week 5 : Charleston, Rumba, Tango, Paso Doble, Viennese Waltz, Quickstep or Samba
Week 6 : Foxtrot, Cha Cha Cha, Quickstep, Tango, Jive or Paso Doble and Salsa Marathon (semi-finale)
Week 7 : Paso Doble, Tango, Samba, Foxtrot, Jive or Rumba and Freestyle (finale)

Dance Chart

 Highest scoring dance
 Lowest scoring dance
 Danced, but not scored

Musical Guests

Ratings
 Week 1 Performance Show & Results Show : 5 318 000 viewers (26,1%)
 Week 2 Performance Show & Results Show : 4 441 000 viewers (21,8%)
 Week 3 Performance Show & Results Show : 4 779 000 viewers (22,9%)
 Week 4 Performance Show & Results Show : 4 909 000 viewers (25,3%)
 Week 5 Performance Show & Results Show : 4 949 000 viewers (22,9%)
 Week 6 Performance Show & Results Show : 5 071 000 viewers (25%)
 Week 7 Performance Show & Results Show : 5 335 000 viewers (25,3%)

References

Season 02
2011 French television seasons